Devon "DJ" Campbell (born c. 2003) is an American football offensive tackle for the Texas Longhorns.

Campbell played high school football at Bowie High School in Arlington, Texas. He was rated by ESPN as the No. 10 football recruit in the 2022 recruiting class.

In February 2022, Campbell signed his letter of commitment to play college football for Texas.

References

Year of birth missing (living people)
2000s births
Living people
American football defensive tackles
Texas Longhorns football players
Sportspeople from Arlington, Texas
Players of American football from Texas